Jizhou is a town in Jizhou City, Hebei, China.

Township-level divisions of Hebei
Jizhou City